Montville Township, Ohio may refer to:

Montville Township, Geauga County, Ohio
Montville Township, Medina County, Ohio

Ohio township disambiguation pages